The 2010–11 Second and Third Division Knock-Out (known as quick Keno Second and Third Division Knock-Out for sponsorship reasons) was a knockout tournament for Maltese football clubs playing in the Second and Third Division. Played between 1 September 2010 and 8 May 2011, Żejtun Corinthians successfully defended last season's title.

Group stage

Group 1

Group 2

Group 3

Group 4

Group 5

Group 6

Group 7

Group 8

Knockout phase

See also 
 2010–11 Maltese Second Division
 2010–11 Maltese Third Division

Maltese Second and Third Division Knock-Out
knock-out